The International Bagpipe Museum is located in Gijón, Asturias, Spain.  The museum was founded in 1965, and moved to its current location, integrated in the Museum of the Asturian People, in 1975.

The museum houses a large collection of bagpipes from Spain, and from the remainder of Europe, Africa, and Asia.  Additionally, the museum features items related to Asturian music.

See also 
 List of music museums

External links

 

Bagpipe museums
Museums in Asturias
Gijón
1965 establishments in Spain
Museums established in 1965